Grant Fitzpatrick (born 18 March 1976)  is an Australian Paralympic swimmer with an intellectual disability.  He was born in the Sydney suburb of Blacktown. He won two silver medals at the 1996 Atlanta Games in the Men's 100 m Freestyle MH and Men's 50 m Freestyle MH events. He had an Australian Institute of Sport Athlete with a Disability scholarship in 1996. In 1996, he was named Blacktown City Council's Sportsperson of the Year.

References

Male Paralympic swimmers of Australia
Swimmers at the 1996 Summer Paralympics
Paralympic silver medalists for Australia
Intellectual Disability category Paralympic competitors
Australian Institute of Sport Paralympic swimmers
Swimmers from Sydney
1976 births
Living people
Medalists at the 1996 Summer Paralympics
Sportspeople with intellectual disability
Paralympic medalists in swimming
Australian male freestyle swimmers